Nadia Essex (born 16 December 1981) is an English television personality and columnist. She is known for appearing as a dating expert on the E4 reality series Celebs Go Dating from 2016 to 2018.

Career
In 2016, Essex became one of the dating experts on the E4 dating reality series, Celebs Go Dating. In 2018, she was suspended from Celebs Go Dating for trolling her former co-host Eden Blackman on social media. Eden later went on to obtain a harassment order against Nadia in 2020. She was removed from show midway through filming of the fifth series in September 2018, reportedly due to "improper use of social media". Lime Pictures issued a statement confirming her suspension, saying she was "found to be setting up fake accounts to troll certain users – which is something that won’t be tolerated". Despite her admitting to setting up several trolling Twitter accounts, Essex subsequently launched legal proceedings against Eden Blackman and Lime Pictures. Nadia's case against Eden was thrown out of court but he later obtained a harassment order against Nadia due to the 'false claims Ms Essex made against' him. If Nadia breaches the order she will face 'fines, have her assets seized, or be imprisoned if comments are found to contain content deemed as harassment' 

In 2018, she appeared as herself on three episodes of Celebrity Ghost Hunt and has appeared on Good Morning Britain. In January 2018, Essex appeared on the fourth series of Celebrity Coach Trip, alongside Bobby-Cole Norris.

Filmography

References

External links 
 

Nationality missing
People from Epsom
1981 births
Living people